Seengen is a municipality in the district of Lenzburg in the canton of Aargau in Switzerland.

Geography

Seengen lies in the Seetal valley to the north of Lake Hallwil.

Of this area,  or 51.3% is used for agricultural purposes, while  or 32.3% is forested.

Of the built up area, housing and buildings made up 9.3% and transportation infrastructure made up 2.6%.  Out of the forested land, all of the forested land area is covered with heavy forests.  Of the agricultural land, 35.6% is used for growing crops and 11.4% is pastures, while 4.3% is used for orchards or vine crops.  All the water in the municipality is in rivers and streams.  Of the unproductive areas, 1.7% is unproductive vegetation.

Coat of arms
The blazon of the municipal coat of arms is Argent an Eagle displayed Sable beaked, langued and membered Gules.

Demographics
, 8.4% of the population are foreign nationals. Over the last 10 years (1997–2007) the population has changed at a rate of 31.4%. Most of the population speaks German (93.9%), with French being second most common ( 1.0%) and Albanian being third ( 1.0%).

The age distribution, in Seengen is; 382 children or 11.7% of the population are between 0 and 9 years old and 435 teenagers or 13.3% are between 10 and 19.  Of the adult population, 357 people or 10.9% of the population are between 20 and 29 years old.  415 people or 12.7% are between 30 and 39, 610 people or 18.6% are between 40 and 49, and 466 people or 14.2% are between 50 and 59.  The senior population distribution is 333 people or 10.2% of the population are between 60 and 69 years old, 161 people or 4.9% are between 70 and 79, there are 107 people or 3.3% who are between 80 and 89, and there are 12 people or 0.4% who are 90 and older.

, there were 59 homes with 1 or 2 persons in the household, 420 homes with 3 or 4 persons in the household, and 439 homes with 5 or more persons in the household.  , there were 952 private households (homes and apartments) in the municipality, and an average of 2.6 persons per household.   there were 573 single family homes (or 42.7% of the total) out of a total of 1,343 homes and apartments.  There were a total of 90 empty apartments for a 6.7% vacancy rate.  , the construction rate of new housing units was 26 new units per 1000 residents.

In the 2007 federal election the most popular party was the SVP which received 38.8% of the vote.  The next three most popular parties were the FDP (21.7%), the SP (14.5%) and the Green Party (8.1%).

The historical population is given in the following table:

Heritage sites of national significance

It is home to one or more prehistoric pile-dwelling (or stilt house) settlements that are part of the Prehistoric Pile dwellings around the Alps UNESCO World Heritage Site.

There are four sites that are listed as a Swiss heritage site of national significance.  These sites include two castles, Brestenberg Castle and Hallwyl Castle as well as the castle mill and on the shores of Lake Hallwil, the late-Bronze Age village at Risi.

Economy
, Seengen had an unemployment rate of 1.2%.  , there were 105 people employed in the primary economic sector and about 28 businesses involved in this sector.  202 people are employed in the secondary sector and there are 27 businesses in this sector.  571 people are employed in the tertiary sector, with 88 businesses in this sector.

 there were 1,304 workers who lived in the municipality.  Of these, 899 or about 68.9% of the residents worked outside Seengen while 421 people commuted into the municipality for work.  There were a total of 826 jobs (of at least 6 hours per week) in the municipality.  Of the working population, 10.2% used public transportation to get to work, and 52.1% used a private car.

Religion
Of the rest of the population, there were 4 individuals (or about 0.16% of the population) who belonged to the Christian Catholic faith.

Education
In Seengen about 80.3% of the population (between age 25-64) have completed either non-mandatory upper secondary education or additional higher education (either university or a Fachhochschule).  Of the school age population, there are 286 students attending primary school, there are 218 students attending secondary school, there are 191 students attending tertiary or university level schooling in the municipality.  Seengen is home to the Schul und Gemeinde Bibliothek Seengen (school and municipal library of Seengen).  The library has 8,758 books or other media, and loaned out 34,413 items in the same year.  It was open a total of 250 days with average of 11 hours per week during that year.

References

Municipalities of Aargau
Cultural property of national significance in Aargau